Aglossosia metaleuca is a moth of the  subfamily Arctiinae. It is found in Sierra Leone.

References

Lithosiini
Moths of Africa